Chondrolectin is a protein that in humans is encoded by the CHODL gene. Mouse chondrolectin is encoded by Chodl.

Structure 

Chondrolectin is a type I membrane protein with a carbohydrate recognition domain characteristic of C-type lectins in its extracellular portion. In other proteins, this domain is involved in endocytosis of glycoproteins and exogenous sugar-bearing pathogens. This protein has been shown to localise to the perinucleus.

Function 

The exact function of chondrolectin is unknown but it has been show to be a marker of fast motor neurons in mice, and is involved in motor neuron development and growth in zebrafish (Danio rerio). Furthermore, human chondrolectin has been shown to localise to motor neurons within the spinal cord.

Clinical significance 

Chondrolectin is alternatively spliced in the spinal cord of mouse models of the neuromuscular disease, spinal muscular atrophy (SMA), which predominantly affects lower motor neurons. Increased levels of chondrolectin in a zebrafish model of SMA results in significant improvements in disease-related motor neuron defects.

References

External links

Further reading